Jamel McLean (born 18 April 1988) is an American professional basketball player who last played for Skyliners Frankfurt of the Basketball Bundesliga.

Professional career
After failing to get drafted at the 2011 NBA draft, Mclean signed with Leuven Bears of Belgium, for the 2011–12 season.

On October 5, 2012, he signed a two-month deal with Telenet Oostende of Belgium. After his contract expired, he left Oostende. On January 5, 2013, he signed with Telekom Baskets Bonn of Germany for the rest of the season. On June 28, 2013, he re-signed with Telekom Bonn for one more season.

On August 5, 2014, McLean signed a one-year contract, with an option for another season, with the German club Alba Berlin. In the 2014–15 season, he was named the Basketball Bundesliga MVP. On July 3, 2015, he opted out of his contract with Alba.

On July 9, 2015, McLean signed a two-year contract with Italian club EA7 Emporio Armani Milano.

On July 12, 2017, McLean signed a two-year contract with Greek club Olympiacos. On June 29, 2018, McLean's agent announced that Olympiacos had opted out of their contract with the player. On July 17, 2018, McLean signed with the Russian team Lokomotiv Kuban.

On August 28, 2019, he has signed with Dinamo Sassari of the Italian Lega Basket Serie A.

At mid 2019-20 season McLean resigned from Sassari to move to Japan, where he signed with Nagoya Diamond Dolphins until the end of the season.

On February 22, 2021, McLean signed with MHP Riesen Ludwigsburg of the Basketball Bundesliga for the remainder of the 2021 season.

On July 7, 2021, he has signed with Casademont Zaragoza of the Liga ACB. McLean averaged 9 points and 4 rebounds per game. He parted ways with the team on November 21.

On November 22, McLean signed with Skyliners Frankfurt of the Basketball Bundesliga.

Career statistics

EuroLeague

|-
| style="text-align:left;"| 2014–15
| style="text-align:left;"| Alba Berlin
| 21 || 14 || 25.4 || .559 || .000 || .770 || 5.6 || 1.6 || 1.0 || .2 || 13.0 || 16.9
|-
| style="text-align:left;"| 2015–16
| style="text-align:left;"| Milano
| 10 || 9 || 22.5 || .531 || .000 || .830 || 4.1 || .9 || 1.0 || .1 || 10.7 || 13.2
|-
| style="text-align:left;"| 2016–17
| style="text-align:left;"| Milano
| 30 || 9 || 20.4 || .591  || .167 || .716 || 4.2 || 1.4 || .7 || .25 || 8.7 || 10
|- class="sortbottom"
| style="text-align:left;"| Career
| style="text-align:left;"|
| 31 || 23 || 24.5 || .551 || .000 || .787 || 5.1 || 1.4 || 1.0 || .2 || 12.3 || 15.7

References

External links
 draftexpress.com profile
 eurobasket.com profile
 EuroLeague profile
 FIBA bio
 Lega Basket profile 
 Xavier Musketeers bio

1988 births
Living people
20th-century African-American people
21st-century African-American sportspeople
African-American basketball players
Alba Berlin players
American expatriate basketball people in Belgium
American expatriate basketball people in Germany
American expatriate basketball people in Greece
American expatriate basketball people in Italy
American expatriate basketball people in Russia
American expatriate basketball people in Spain
American men's basketball players
Basketball players from New York City
Basketball players from Virginia
Basket Zaragoza players
BC Oostende players
Centers (basketball)
Dinamo Sassari players
Kumamoto Volters players
Lega Basket Serie A players
Leuven Bears players
Liga ACB players
Riesen Ludwigsburg players
Nagoya Diamond Dolphins players
Olimpia Milano players
Olympiacos B.C. players
PBC Lokomotiv-Kuban players
Power forwards (basketball)
Skyliners Frankfurt players
Sportspeople from Brooklyn
Sportspeople from Hampton, Virginia
Telekom Baskets Bonn players
Tulsa Golden Hurricane men's basketball players
Xavier Musketeers men's basketball players